Known to most as une Todd

Todd Strobeck (born August 17, 1966) is a retired U.S. soccer goalkeeper who four seasons in the Western Soccer Alliance, one in the American Professional Soccer League, one in Major Indoor Soccer League and at least one in USISL.

Strobeck attended Warner Pacific College where he played on the men’s soccer team from 1984 to 1987.  While still in college, he also played for F.C. Portland, a local semi-pro team in the Western Soccer Alliance during the collegiate off-season.  Strobeck played with F.C. Portland from 1985 through 1988.  In his last season with the team he was the alliance’s All Star goalkeeper.

In 1989, Strobeck sat out the outdoor season as Kasey Keller replaced him as the starting goalkeeper.  However, Strobeck returned in 1990 to Portland, now renamed the Timbers.  In 1990, he moved north to join the Tacoma Stars of the Major Indoor Soccer League (MISL) for two seasons.

In 1993, he joined the F.C. Seattle Storm in the Pacific Coast Soccer League, playing through the 1995 season with them.  He was with the Everett BigFoot of the U.S. Independent Soccer League (USISL) Professional League in 1996.  

He now owns a real estate agency in Federal Way, Washington with his wife.

References

External links
 Timbers info
 MISL stats

1966 births
Living people
Western Soccer Alliance players
Seattle Storm (soccer) players
American Professional Soccer League players
Portland Timbers (1985–1990) players
Major Indoor Soccer League (1978–1992) players
Tacoma Stars players
USISL players
Everett BigFoot players
Warner Pacific Knights men's soccer players
People from Federal Way, Washington
Soccer players from Washington (state)
Association football goalkeepers
American soccer players